In Pakistan, there are two laws governing Hindu marriages. One is the  Sindh Hindu Marriage act of 2016 which is applicable in the Sindh province of Pakistan and another is the Hindu marriage act of 2017 which is applicable in Islamabad Capital Territory, Balochistan, Khyber-Pakhtunkhwa and Punjab provinces. However, there are no laws and amendments made to register a marriage between two Hindus- one from Sindh and another from a different Province (Islamabad Capital Territory, Balochistan, Khyber-Pakhtunkhwa and Punjab).

Sindh Hindu Marriage Act of 2016
It is the first Hindu marriage act in Pakistan. It is applicable for Hindus living in the Sindh province. The Sikhs and Zorastrians can also register their marriage under this act.

The Hindu Marriage Bill 2016 was moved by Sindh Parliamentary Affairs Minister Nisar Ahmed Khuhro. In February 2016, the Provincial Assembly of Sindh passed the bill. As per this act any Hindu male and female above 18 can register their marriage.

In 2018, the act was amended to add divorce and remarriage rights for couples and financial security of the wife and children after divorce. The amendment was proposed by Pakistan Muslim League-Functional(PML-F) assembly member Nand Kumar Goklani.

In 2018, first inter-caste Hindu marriage was registered under the Sindh Hindu marriage act in Mirpurkhas District.

Hindu marriage act of 2017
It is the first federal level personal law for Hindus. It is applicable to the Hindus living in Islamabad Capital Territory, Balochistan, Khyber-Pakhtunkhwa and Punjab provinces.
The Hindu Marriage Bill was moved by Human Rights Minister Kamran Michael in 2016. It was unanimously passed by the National Assembly of Pakistan in 2016. In 2017, the Senate of Pakistan passed the bill. In March 2017, the Pakistani President Mamnoon Hussain signed the Hindu Marriage Bill and thereby making it a law. The bill paves the way for regulations on registration of marriages and divorce for Hindus and fixes the minimum marrying age for males and females at 18 years-old.

See also
 Hinduism in Pakistan
 Divorce in Pakistan
 Women related laws in Pakistan
 Forced conversion of minority girls in Pakistan

References

Marriage in Pakistan
Family law in Pakistan
Hindu law
Acts of the Parliament of Pakistan
Pakistan
Hinduism in Pakistan
Pakistan